The Vuilleumier cycle was patented by a Swiss-American engineer named Rudolph Vuilleumier in 1918. The purpose of Vuilleumier's machine was to create a heat pump that would use heat at high temperature as energy input. The Vuilleumier cycle...utilize[s] working gas expansion and compression at three variable volume spaces in order to pump heat from a low to a moderate temperature level. The interesting characteristic of the Vuilleumier machine is that the induced volume variations are realized without the use of work, but thermally. This is the reason why it has a potential to operate at modern applications where the pollution of the environment is not a choice. It is a perfect candidate for such applications, as it consists only of metallic parts and inert gas. Using these units for heating and cooling buildings, large energy savings can be accomplished as they can be operated at small scale in common buildings or at large scale providing heat power to entire building blocks without using fossil fuels. The use of Vuilleumier machines for industrial applications or inside vehicles is also a feasible option. Another field where these machines have already been involved is cryogenics, as they are also able to provide refrigeration at very low temperatures like the very similar and well-known Stirling refrigerators.The Vuilleumier cycle is a thermodynamic cycle with applications in low-temperature cooling. In some respects it resembles a Stirling cycle or engine, although it has two "displacers" with a mechanical linkage connecting them as compared to one in the Stirling cycle.  The hot displacer is larger than the cold displacer. The coupling maintains the appropriate phase difference. The displacers do no workthey are not pistons. Thus no work is required in an ideal case to operate the cycle. In reality friction and other losses mean that some work is required.

Devices operating on this cycle have been able to produce temperatures as low as 15 K using liquid nitrogen to pre-cool. Without precooling 77 K was reached with a heat flow of 1 W.

The cycle was first patented by Vuilleumier in 1918 with patent US1275507, and again in Leiden by KW Taconis in 1951. In March 2014, the Vuilleumier Cycle was tested in application with updating conventional HVAC (heating, ventilation, and air-conditioning) systems by utilizing the cycle's proposed thermodynamic process of moving heat energy, and having results of increased output efficiencies coupled with a reduced carbon footprint. This work was completed by ThermoLift (http://www.tm-lift.com/), a company based out of the Advanced Energy Research and Technology Center at Stony Brook University, with collaboration from the US Department of Energy and the New York State Energy Research and Development Authority (NYSERDA). This work culminated in the demonstration of the ThermoLift system at Oak Ridge National Laboratory in August, 2018. The demonstration showed that the ThermoLift technology (TCHP), is able to achieve coefficients of performance (COP) for the cycle that well exceeded the DOE’s target COPs for cold-climate heat pumps (although not at all exceeding Geothermal heat pump efficiencies). Furthermore, due to the nature of the TCHP, there is no significant capacity decrease as the inlet temperature to the cold HX decreases.

External links 
 Method and Apparatus for Inducing Heat Changes, Patent Application by R. Vuilleumier, 1918
 All US Patents based on Vuilleumier's original patent, 938 patents as of Sept 2020
 Vuilleumier Cycle Cryogenic Refrigeration, Technical Report, Air Force Flight Dynamics Laboratory, Air Force Wright Aeronautical Laboratories, Air Force System Command, April 1976 
 Fractional Watt Vuilleumier Cryogenic Refrigerator, Final Report for Task 1 Preliminary Design, The Garrett Corporation, AiResearch Manufacturing Co, Prepared for Goddard Space Flight Center, March 1973
 The High-Capacity, Spaceborne, Vuilleumier Refrigerator by R. D. Doody, November 1980

References

 Experimental techniques in low-temperature physics, Guy Kendall White, Philip J. Meeson, Oxford University Press, 2002, p. 30 Link
Energy Savings Potential and RD&D Opportunities for Non-Vapor-Compression HVAC Technologies, U.S. Department of Energy, William Goetzler, Robert Zogg, Jim Young, Caitlin Johnson, Navigant Consulting, Inc. March 2014 Link

Thermodynamics